Wadi Fira is one of the 23 regions of Chad. Its capital is the town of Biltine. The region corresponds with the former prefecture of Biltine.

Geography 

The region borders Borkou Region, Ennedi-Ouest Region and Ennedi-Est Region to the north, Sudan to the east, Ouaddaï Region to the south, and Batha Region to the west. The terrain is savannah merging into the Sahara Desert in the north, and rising to the east.

Settlements 
Biltine is the region's capital; other major settlements include Guéréda, Iriba and Matadjana.

Demographics 
As per the 2009 Chadian census, Wadi Fira's population is 508,383. The main ethnolinguistic groups are the Amdang, Baggara (generally speakers of Chadian Arabic), Maba, Mararit, Tama and Zaghawa.

Subdivisions
The region of Wadi Fira is divided into three departments, each listed with the name of its capital or main town (chef-lieu in French) and a list of sub-prefectures (sous-préfectures).

References

 
Regions of Chad